Irish singer Margo has released 22 studio albums, 30 compilation albums, six video albums, six extended plays, and 43 singles. She charted 13 songs on the Irish Singles Chart between 1968 and 1989, including the number one single "I'll Forgive and I'll Try to Forget".

Studio albums

Compilation albums

Video albums

Extended plays

Singles

Notes

References

Country music discographies
Discographies of Irish artists